The Sun Odyssey 39 is a French sailboat that was designed by Jacques Fauroux as a cruiser and first built in 1990.

The design is a cruising development of the 1988 Sun Charm 39 and the 1989 Sun Fast 39, with which it shares a hull design.

Production
The design was built by Jeanneau in France, starting in 1990, but it is now out of production.

Design
The Sun Odyssey 39 is a recreational keelboat, built predominantly of fiberglass, with wood trim. It has a masthead sloop rig. The hull has a raked stem, a reverse transom with steps and a swimming platform, a skeg-mounted rudder controlled by a wheel and a fixed fin keel or optional shoal draft wing keel. It displaces  and carries  of ballast.

The design has sleeping accommodation for four people, with a double "V"-berth in the bow cabin, a "U"-shaped settee and a straight settee in the main cabin and an aft cabin with a double berth on the starboard side. The galley is located on the port side just aft of the companionway ladder. The galley is "U"-shaped and is equipped with a two-burner stove, an ice box and a double sink. A navigation station is forward of the galley, on the port side. There are two heads, one just aft of the bow cabin on the starboard side and one on the starboard side forward of the aft cabin.

See also
List of sailing boat types

References

External links

Keelboats
1990s sailboat type designs
Sailing yachts
Sailboat type designs by Jacques Fauroux
Sailboat types built by Jeanneau